Schmidt Glacier is a glacier, 0.7 nautical miles (1.3 km) long, flowing west from Baudissin Glacier between Mount Drygalski and North West Cornice, on the west side of Heard Island in the southern Indian Ocean. To the north of Schmidt Glacier is Baudissin Glacier, whose terminus is located at the western side of Corinthian Bay, near Sealers Cove. Kildalkey Head is west of Schmidt Glacier. To the south of Schmidt Glacier is Vahsel Glacier, whose terminus is at South West Bay, between Erratic Point and Cape Gazert. Click here to see a map of Schmidt Glacier and the northwestern coast of Heard Island.

Discovery and naming
Schmidt Glacier was roughly charted in 1902 by the 1st German Antarctic Expedition under Erich von Drygalski. He named it for Dr. J. Schmidt of the Royal Prussian Ministry, who assisted in obtaining government support for the expedition.

References

Further reading

External links
Click here to see a map of Heard Island and McDonald Islands, including all major topographical features
Australian Antarctic Division
Australian Antarctic Gazetteer
Composite Gazetteer of Antarctica
Australian Antarctic Names and Medals Committee (AANMC)
United States Geological Survey, Geographic Names Information System (GNIS)
Scientific Committee on Antarctic Research (SCAR)

Glaciers of Heard Island and McDonald Islands